Stolnici is a commune in Argeș County, Muntenia, Romania. It is composed of six villages: Cochinești, Cotmeana, Fâlfani, Izbășești, Stolnici and Vlășcuța.

References

Communes in Argeș County
Localities in Muntenia